Michael Walsh (born Nuku'alofa, Tonga 1963) is a New Zealand diplomat. Walsh was appointed the High Commissioner of New Zealand to Kiribati in August 2011 to replace former High Commissioner Robert Kaiwai. Walsh also serves concurrently as the Ambassador of New Zealand to the Marshall Islands, the Federated States of Micronesia, and Palau. (All High Commissioners to Kiribati are accredited to those three Micronesian countries as well).

A career diplomat, Walsh previously served as the Deputy High Commissioner in Pretoria, South Africa; the Deputy Head of Mission in Riyadh, Saudi Arabia; and the Second Secretary at the Embassy of New Zealand in Apia, Samoa. Walsh held the position of Deputy Director of the Pacific Division of the New Zealand Ministry of Foreign Affairs and Trade at the time of his appointment as High Commissioner to Kiribati in 2011.

Walsh's appointment as High Commissioner to Kiribati was announced by Minister of Foreign Affairs Murray McCully. He replaced former High Commissioner Robert KaiKai, who left the High Commission to become Consul General of New Zealand in Hong Kong.

References

High Commissioners of New Zealand to Kiribati
Ambassadors of New Zealand to the Marshall Islands
Ambassadors of New Zealand to the Federated States of Micronesia
Ambassadors of New Zealand to Palau
Living people
1963 births